Warren Thompson (born October 24, 1990) is an English professional rugby league footballer who plays as a  or second row forward for the North Wales Crusaders in Betfred League 1. 
He was previously with St Helens (Heritage № 1191) and Rochdale Hornets.

He signed for the club from Thatto Heath Crusaders.

References

External links
North Wales Crusaders profile
Saints Heritage Society profile

1990 births
Living people
English rugby league players
North Wales Crusaders players
Rochdale Hornets players
Rugby league players from St Helens, Merseyside
Rugby league second-rows
St Helens R.F.C. players